Artworks is a 2003 crime film directed by Jim Amatulli and starring Virginia Madsen, Rick Rossovich, Eddie Mills, and Daniel von Bargen.

Premise
A police chief's daughter, in home security sales, contacts an art gallery possessor. They love art and have despise for their clients' motives for gathering artworks. They think of a plot to steal overlooked but valuable artworks from her affluent clients' homes.

Cast
 Virginia Madsen - Emma
 Rick Rossovich - Brett
 Eddie Mills - Cory
 Daniel von Bargen - Howard (Emma's father)

References

External links

2003 films
2000s English-language films
2000s crime films
American crime films
2000s American films